El Rey del Mundo is the name of two premium cigar brands, one produced on the island of Cuba for Habanos SA, the Cuban state-owned tobacco company, and other produced in Honduras by the Villazon family.

History 

Believed to have been created, along with Sancho Panza, by German businessman Emilio Ohmstedt in 1848, El Rey del Mundo (King of the World in Spanish) was at one time the most expensive and prestigious cigar brand in the world.

Spanish businessman Antonio Allones took over the brand sometime around 1882 (a rival version of the brand's history claims the brand became defunct after Ohmstedt's death and Allones re-registered it, but cigar connoisseur Min Ron Nee maintains the brand was passed to Allones from Ohmstedt's company, based on records stating Allones as the owner of El Rey del Mundo from as early as 1873). Under Allones, the brand reached the height of its worldwide prestige. In 1905, Allones' company was bought by the Díaz Hermanos y Cía venture, owned by Cándido Vega Díaz (supposedly the namesake of Don Cándido cigars), which was later renamed the Rey del Mundo Cigar Co. to reflect its most famous asset. Production moved to a factory at 852 Calle Belascoain in Havana. The company also produced such famous brands as Sancho Panza, Rafael González, and Don Cándido.

Production continued after the Revolution and the brand maintained its popularity through the 1960s and 1970s, but as the world taste started to run towards stronger cigars, the milder El Rey del Mundo brand began to lose its status as a foremost brand of Cuban cigars. Despite its loss of popularity, El Rey del Mundos cigars are still prized for their mild, complex flavors, with the Choix Supreme, Grandes de España, and Demi Tasse sizes being particularly popular among connoisseurs.

Vitolas in the El Rey del Mundo Line

The following list of vitolas de salida (commercial vitolas) within the El Rey del Mundo marque lists their size and ring gauge in Imperial (and Metric), their vitolas de galera (factory vitolas), and their common name in American cigar slang.

Hand-Made Vitolas
 Choix Supreme - 5" × 48 (127 × 19.05 mm), Hermoso No. 4, a corona extra
 Demi Tasse - 3⅞" × 30 (98 × 11.91 mm), Entreacto, a short panetela
 Grande de España - 7½" × 38 (191 × 15.08 mm), Delicado, a small panetela
 Lunch Club - 4⅝" × 40 (117 × 15.88 mm), Franciscano, a petit corona
 Petit Corona - 5⅛" × 42 (130 × 16.67 mm), Mareva, a petit corona
 La Reina (UK Regional Edition 2018) - 7½" × 38 (192 × 15.08 mm), Laguito No. 1, a small panetela
aguante racing

See also 
 Cigar brands

References
 Nee, Min Ron - An Illustrated Encyclopaedia of Post-Revolution Havana Cigars (2003, Reprinted: 2005),

External links
 Official website of Habanos S.A.

Habanos S.A. brands